Weyn may refer to:

Goob Weyn, a town in the southern Lower Juba region of Somalia
Mahaday Weyn, a district of the southeastern Middle Shebelle (Shabeellaha Dhexe) region in Somalia
Suzanne Weyn (born 1955), American author
Weyn Ockers (died 1568), Dutch Protestant sentenced to death